Frank Hayes (1901 – June 4, 1923) was a jockey who, on June 4, 1923, at Belmont Park racetrack in Elmont, New York, won a steeplechase despite suffering a fatal heart attack in the latter part of the race.

Death
The twenty-two-year-old Hayes had never won a race before, as by profession he was not a jockey but a horse trainer and stableman. The horse, a 20:1 outsider called Sweet Kiss, was owned by Miss A. M. Frayling. Hayes died in the latter part of the race and his body remained in the saddle when Sweet Kiss crossed the finish line, winning by a head, making him the first, and so far only, jockey known to have won a race after death.

Aftermath
Hayes' death was not discovered until Miss Frayling and race officials came to congratulate him shortly after the race. It was suggested that the fatal heart attack may have been brought on by Hayes' extreme efforts to meet the weight requirements, as a newspaper reported he had slimmed down from 142 pounds to 130 pounds in a very short time.

After the discovery of Hayes' death, all further post-race formalities were waived by the Jockey Club, the result being declared official without the weighing in. Hayes was buried three days later, dressed in his racing silks at Holy Cross Cemetery in Brooklyn, New York. The horse never raced again, and it's claimed that Sweet Kiss was nicknamed "Sweet Kiss of Death" for the rest of her life.

References

American jockeys
1901 births
1923 deaths
Jockeys who died while racing
Sports deaths in New York (state)
Place of birth missing
Date of death missing
Place of death missing